José Luis Fidalgo Veloso (23 March 1937 – 13 November 2019) was a Spanish footballer who played as a striker.

He amassed La Liga totals of 84 games and 33 goals over the course of six seasons, representing Deportivo and Real Madrid.

Club career
Born in Santiago de Compostela, Galicia, Veloso played professionally with Deportivo de La Coruña, Real Madrid, CD Ourense and Rayo Vallecano. With the second club he was used almost exclusively as a reserve, but still managed to score nine goals in only 16 games in the 1966–67 season to win the first of his three La Liga championships with the team; additionally, he netted three times in just five matches in the European Cup, being part of the squad that won the 1966 edition.

Veloso returned in 1973 at the age of 36, after one year with local SD Compostela in the lower leagues.

International career
Veloso earned four caps for Spain in seven months. Two of his three goals came in the qualifying phase for the 1964 European Nations' Cup, which the country eventually won as hosts – he was overlooked for the finals, however.

International goals

Death
Veloso died on 13 November 2019, at the age of 82.

Honours

Club
Real Madrid
La Liga: 1966–67, 1967–68, 1968–69
European Cup: 1965–66

Individual
Pichichi Trophy (Segunda División): 1960–61

References

External links

1937 births
2019 deaths
Spanish footballers
Footballers from Santiago de Compostela
Association football forwards
La Liga players
Segunda División players
Tercera División players
Celta de Vigo B players
Deportivo de La Coruña players
Real Madrid CF players
CD Ourense footballers
Rayo Vallecano players
SD Compostela footballers
Spain international footballers